Paxton is a village in Keith County, Nebraska, United States. The population was 523 at the 2010 census.

History
Paxton was named for W. A. Paxton, a rancher.

Geography

Demographics

2010 census
As of the census of 2010, there were 523 people, 226 households, and 146 families living in the village. The racial makeup of the village was 98.3% White, 1.0% Asian, 0.4% from other races, and 0.4% from two or more races. Hispanic or Latino of any race were 1.9% of the population.

There were 226 households, of which 28.3% had children under the age of 18 living with them, 53.1% were married couples living together, 8.8% had a female householder with no husband present, 2.7% had a male householder with no wife present, and 35.4% were non-families. 31.4% of all households were made up of individuals, and 11.1% had someone living alone who was 65 years of age or older. The average household size was 2.31 and the average family size was 2.97.

The median age in the village was 41.9 years. 25.8% of residents were under the age of 18; 5.9% were between the ages of 18 and 24; 23.5% were from 25 to 44; 32% were from 45 to 64; and 12.8% were 65 years of age or older. The gender makeup of the village was 52.2% male and 47.8% female.

2000 census
As of the census of 2000, there were 614 people, 237 households, and 169 families living in the village. The population density was 1,118.4 people per square mile (431.0/km). There were 248 housing units at an average density of 451.7 per square mile (174.1/km). The racial makeup of the village was 97.72% White, 0.49% African American, 0.49% Native American, 0.16% Asian, 0.33% from other races, and 0.81% from two or more races. Hispanic or Latino of any race were 1.63% of the population.

There were 237 households, out of which 38.8% had children under the age of 18 living with them, 62.0% were married couples living together, 6.8% had a female householder with no husband present, and 28.3% were non-families. 24.9% of all households were made up of individuals, and 13.1% had someone living alone who was 65 years of age or older. The average household size was 2.59 and the average family size was 3.11.

In the village, the population was spread out, with 29.5% under the age of 18, 5.0% from 18 to 24, 27.9% from 25 to 44, 22.3% from 45 to 64, and 15.3% who were 65 years of age or older. The median age was 38 years. For every 100 females, there were 97.4 males. For every 100 females age 18 and over, there were 92.4 males.

As of 2000 the median income for a household in the village was $28,523, and the median income for a family was $34,063. Males had a median income of $25,833 versus $17,500 for females. The per capita income for the village was $12,988. About 9.2% of families and 9.5% of the population were below the poverty line, including 10.6% of those under age 18 and 9.3% of those age 65 or over.

Notable person
Josh Rouse, singer-songwriter

References

Villages in Keith County, Nebraska
Villages in Nebraska